Haines Township is located in Marion County, Illinois. As of the 2010 census, its population was 1,002 and it contained 422 housing units.

Geography 

Haines Township (T1N R3E) is centered at 38°31'N 88°52'W (38.519, -88.869).

Demographics

Adjacent townships 
 Stevenson Township (north)
 Iuka Township (northeast)
 Romine Township (east)
 Farrington Township, Jefferson County (southeast)
 Field Township, Jefferson County (south)
 Rome Township, Jefferson County (southwest)
 Raccoon Township (west)
 Salem Township (northwest)

References

External links
City-data.com
Illinois State Archives

Townships in Marion County, Illinois
Townships in Illinois